Yuraq Rumi (Quechuan yuraq white, rumi stone, "white stone", Hispanicized spelling Yuracrumi) is a mountain in the Wansu mountain range in the Andes of Peru, about  high. It is situated in the Arequipa Region, La Unión Province, Puyca District. Yuraq Rumi lies southeast of Q'illu Urqu.

References 

Mountains of Arequipa Region